Günther Scheel (23 November 1921 – MIA 16 July 1943) was a German Luftwaffe fighter ace during World War II. A flying ace or fighter ace is a military aviator credited with shooting down five or more enemy aircraft during aerial combat. He is credited with 71 enemy aircraft shot down in only 70 combat missions, all of which he claimed over the Eastern Front. He is the only pilot with over ten victories known to have scored a strike rate higher than 1:1, having achieved more combat kills than his missions flown.

Born in Dannenberg, he was trained as a fighter pilot and was posted to Jagdgeschwader 54 (JG 54—54th Fighter Wing) in early 1943. At the time JG 54 was based at airfields near Leningrad where he claimed his first aerial victory on 9 February 1943 during the Siege of Leningrad. In July 1943, his unit was moved to an airfield at Oryol, where it fought in Operation Citadel. In 12 days of combat during the Battle of Kursk, Scheel claimed 31 further aerial victories. On 16 July, he claimed his 71st and last aerial victory before he had a mid-air collision with a Soviet fighter. Crashing behind enemy lines, he was reported missing in action, presumed killed in action. Posthumously, Scheel was awarded the Knight's Cross of the Iron Cross.

Early life and career
Scheel was born on 23 November 1921 in Dannenberg in the Province of Hanover of the Weimar Republic. In early 1943, Scheel had completed flight training and was posted to 2. Staffel (2nd squadron) of Jagdgeschwader 54 (JG 54—54th Fighter Wing), a squadron of I. Gruppe (1st group) in late January.

World War II
On Friday 1 September 1939 German forces invaded Poland which marked the beginning of World War II, and in June 1941, Germany invaded the Soviet Union which created the Eastern Front. In February 1943, I. Gruppe of JG 54 was equipped with the Focke-Wulf Fw 190 A-4 and engaged in the Siege of Leningrad. The combat area was predominantly in the east and southeast of Leningrad where Soviet forces had created a corridor to the city in Operation Iskra.

That day, I. Gruppe claimed seven aerial victories, including a Lavochkin La-5 and Lavochkin-Gorbunov-Gudkov LaGG-3 fighter by Scheel. On 14 February, weather conditions over Leningrad improved and air operations picked up again resulting in 19 aerial victories plus a tethered balloon claimed by I. Gruppe. This number includes two Ilyushin Il-2 ground attack aircraft shot down by Scheel northeast of Lyuban. On 18 February, the Gruppe again flew missions to Lyuban and claimed four victories, among them an Il-2 credited to Scheel. On 23 February, Soviet forces launched an attack south of Leningrad as part of Operation Polyarnaya Zvezda. The attack was repelled by forces under the command of Generalleutnant Carl Hilpert. That day, all available aircraft of I. Gruppe flew missions in defense of this attack, predominantly attacking Soviet ground attack aircraft. By nightfall, the Gruppe reported 32 Soviet aircraft destroyed, including another Il-2 claimed by Scheel in the vicinity of Mga, southeast of Leningrad.

In late March, Soviet forces continued to pressure the 18th Army while in parallel an attack at Novgorod was launched. In defense of these attacks, I. Gruppe claimed four aerial victories, including a LaGG-3 north of Pushkin by Scheel on 21 March. Three days later, he claimed one of five aerial victories credited to I. Gruppe, an Il-2, taking his total to eight. After a period of bad weather, I. Gruppe flew several missions to the east and southeast of Leningrad on 3 April, reporting ten aerial victories. Additionally, 11 Fw 190s were sent on a ground attack mission against anti-aircraft artillery and infantry positions southeast of Woronowo as well as the train station at Lebjashje where some damage was inflicted. Scheel was credited with the destruction of a Bell P-39 Airacobra southeast of Leningrad that day. Weather conditions limited flight operations for the next few days until 8 April. I. Gruppe was in the air again and encountered Soviet fighters in the vicinity of Lomonosov where Scheel claimed a La-5 shot down. Sources vary with respect to the number, location and time of aerial victories Scheel was credited with on 16 April. According to the authors Prien, Stemmer, Rodeike and Bock, Scheel claimed two La-5s between 12:04 and 12:25 in an unknown location. According to Mathews and Foreman. Scheel was credited with a La-5 destroyed at 19:05 west of Lomonosov. That day, I. Gruppe claimed five aerial victories in combat near Leningrad.

The weather continued to impact flight operations for both sides and on 1 May, Scheel was the only pilot of I. Gruppe to claim an aerial victory (his 13th), an La-5. Although the weather had improved on 5 May, flight operations on both sides were limited to the front lines of Leningrad. In defense of a few attacks by ground attack aircraft and their escort fighters, Scheel claimed two LaGG-3 fighters south of the city, the only two claims filed that day by I. Gruppe. On 24 May, I. Gruppe was deployed over the combat area of the 16th Army, east of Soltsy where Soviet forces had attacked elements of Generalleutnant Gustav Höhne's forces south of Lake Ilmen. In total, the Gruppe claimed twelve aircraft shot down, including two Il-2s by Scheel. On 30 May, I. Gruppe escorted a number of Heinkel He 111 bombers from Kampfgeschwader 53 (KG 53—53rd Bomber Wing) on their mission to bomb the bridges spanning the Volkhov River at Volkhov. In addition to a LaGG-3 claimed at 13:48, he was credited with three aerial victories in defense of the bombers, two LaGG-3s and a Curtiss P-40 Warhawk.

On 5 June, I. Gruppe flew combat air patrols in the area of Volkhov and escort missions for KG 53 attacking the locks at Novaya Ladoga. That day, Scheel claimed two victories over LaGG-3 fighters. I. Gruppe saw little combat on 10 June; only Scheel was credited with an aerial victory. In combat north of Grusino, which is part of Chudovo, he shot down a La-5 fighter. He was credited with the destruction of another La-5 on 18 June. In combat near Volkhov, I. Gruppe claimed seven victories that day. On 21 June, Scheel claimed aerial victories numbering 26 to 29 which included three LaGG-3s and a La-5. That day, I. Gruppe predominantly flew missions over Leningrad and claimed 19 victories. Scheel flew his 50th combat mission on 22 June and claimed his 30th aerial victory. That day, I. Gruppe claimed five aircraft destroyed, including a LaGG-3 by Scheel. The Gruppe flew its last combat missions before relocating on 24 June. In addition to his 30 aerial victories claimed in the greater vicinity of Leningrad, Scheel also flew a number of ground attack missions, destroying a number of locomotives and other vehicles.

Operation Citadel

In early July, I. Gruppe of JG 54 was ordered to move to Oryol, in the southern sector of Army Group Centre, where it fought in Operation Citadel which initiated the Battle of Kursk. Subordinated to Luftflotte 6 (Air Fleet 6), the Gruppe began relocating on 2 July and arrived at the airfield name Panikowo, a makeshift airfield created for the attack on the Kursk salient, on 4 July. The next day, the Wehrmacht launched Operation Citadel and I. Gruppe supported the attack of the 9th Army on the northern sector of the salient, escorting bombers of Kampfgeschwader 4, 51 and KG 53 (KG 4, KG 51—4th, 51st Bomber Wing), as well as Junkers Ju 87 dive bombers of Sturzkampfgeschwader 1 (StG 1—1st Dive Bomber Wing) to their target areas. That day, I. Gruppe claimed 59 aerial victories, including eight by Scheel in the vicinity of Maloarkhangelsk, making him an "ace-in-a-day" for the first time. The next day, I. Gruppe targeted the airspace near Ponyri and during multiple combat missions claimed 29 aerial victories which included a La-5 shot down by Scheel at 11:48 northeast of Ponyri. On 7 July, the German attack had been halted near Ponyri and Olkhovatka by Soviet forces. I. Gruppe claimed 35 victories and Scheel again made "ace-in-a-day", claiming seven victories which included four Il-2 ground attack aircraft shot down between 08:30 and 08:32.

On 8 July, I. Gruppe flew fighter escort missions for StG 1 as well as a number of combat air patrols in the vicinity of Ponyri. Although Luftwaffe fighters maintained local air superiority over the combat area of the 9th Army, German ground forces were hard pressed by a Soviet armor attack. That day, I. Gruppe claimed ten aerial victories, including a Douglas A-20 Havoc "Boston" bomber, a La-5 fighter and P-39 fighter by Scheel. The next day, Scheel claimed three further aerial victories which included his 50th in total, a P-39 shot down southwest of Maloarkhangelsk. On the sixth day of the operation, 10 July, the German advance in the north had completely come to a halt. I. Gruppe flew escort missions and combat air patrols over Maloarkhangelsk resulting in 24 aerial victories claimed. Scheel claimed five victories, becoming an "ace-in-a-day" for the third time. The objectives for I. Gruppe did not change on the next day. In total the Gruppe claimed seven victories, including three fighters shot down by Scheel on the early morning mission taking his total to 60.

On 12 July the Soviets launched Operation Kutuzov, their counter-offensive upon the Oryol salient, which threatened the flank and rear of the 9th Army. In support of German forces near Novosil and Mtsensk, I. Gruppe claimed ten victories, including an Il-2 ground attack aircraft by Scheel. The next day, Scheel became an "ace-in-a-day" for the fourth and last time during his combat career. All day, the Gruppe flew missions over the Oryol salient, claiming 32 aerial victories. This figure includes Scheel's aerial victories numbering 62 to 67, including three Yakovlev Yak-9 fighters in just two minutes. On 14 July, the Soviet attacks on the 2nd Panzer Army forced the 9th Army to strengthen its defenses, effectively making Operation Citadel a failure on the northern sector. Rainy weather impacted air operations on both sides, nevertheless I. Gruppe claimed eight aircraft shot down, including an Il-2 shot down by Scheel northwest of Bolkhov. The next day, weather conditions deteriorated further, significantly limiting air operations and no victories were claimed by I. Gruppe.

Missing in action
On the morning of 16 July 1943, flying Fw 190 A-5 (Werknummer 710002—factory number) on his second combat mission of the day, he shot down two Yak-9 fighters taking his total to 71.

The loss report read:
"Ltn Scheel took off at 07:07 hours together with 3. Staffel of I./JG 54 in order to provide a Stuka formation with fighter escort in the vicinity of Orel. After completion of this mission, Ltn Scheel shot down two Yak-9s, during a subsequent fighter sweep. During the second combat, his 71st in total, his left wing hit the enemy aircraft. The wing broke off at the fuselage, which caused the aircraft to immediately start descending from an altitude of 800 metres. In 50 metres altitude the aircraft caught fire and exploded on impact in Planquadrat 64356, at 8.06 hours. Point of impact: about 15 kilometres northeast of Bolkhov".

Weal claims that Scheel may have been the first pilot to claim 50 aerial victories while flying the Fw 190. According to Spick, Scheel, of all Luftwaffe fighter pilots, flew the fewest combat missions per aerial victory claimed. Posted to a front line unit in early 1943, he flew 70 combat missions and was credited with 71 aerial victories, all of which claimed on the Eastern Front. He was posthumously awarded the German Cross in Gold on 31 August 1943, the Honour Goblet of the Luftwaffe on 13 September 1943, and the Knight's Cross of the Iron Cross on 5 December 1943.

Scheel was reportedly seen in a camp at Yelabuga in 1946, and receiving medical treatment in a camp at Solny in 1948. However, he officially remains missing in action.

Summary of career

Aerial victory claims
According to US historian David T. Zabecki, Scheel was credited with 71 aerial victories claimed in 70 combat missions, making it the highest kill-to-mission ratio. All of his aerial victories were claimed on the Eastern Front. Heaton, Lewis, Olds and Schulze also list him with 71 aerial victories. Mathews and Foreman, authors of Luftwaffe Aces — Biographies and Victory Claims, researched the German Federal Archives and state that Scheel was credited with 70 aerial victories, all of which claimed on the Eastern Front.

Victory claims were logged to a map-reference (PQ = Planquadrat), for example "PQ 36 Ost 10123". These sectors were then subdivided into 36 smaller units to give a location area 3 × 4 km in size.

Awards
 Iron Cross (1939) 2nd and 1st Class
 German Cross in Gold on 31 August 1943 (posthumously) as Leutnant in the I./Jagdgeschwader 54
 Honour Goblet of the Luftwaffe on 13 September 1943 (posthumously) as Leutnant and pilot
 Knight's Cross of the Iron Cross on 5 December 1943 (posthumously) as Leutnant and Staffelführer of the 3./Jagdgeschwader 54

See also
 List of people who disappeared

Notes

References

Citations

Bibliography

 
 
 
 
 
 
 
 
 
 
 
 
 
 
 
 
 
 

1921 births
1943 deaths
Aerial disappearances of military personnel in action
Luftwaffe pilots
German World War II flying aces
Luftwaffe personnel killed in World War II
Missing in action of World War II
Recipients of the Gold German Cross
Recipients of the Knight's Cross of the Iron Cross
People from Dannenberg (Elbe)
Military personnel from Lower Saxony